Praise is a studio album by Puerto Rican American rapper Emcee N.I.C.E., released on September 14, 2017. Praise is Emcee N.I.C.E's first Christian hip hop album and earned him a Stellar Awards nomination for Best Gospel Rap CD of the Year.

Singles
The lead single from the album, called "I Got Angels" was released on July 20, 2017. The song peaked at #1 on both the Billboard Digital Song Sales and Billboard Hot Single Sales Chart. The music video for "I Got Angels" was released on April 19, 2018. "Alright" featuring Stripped, Rahkua & The Georgia All-Stars was sent to the Praise stations on February 2, 2018 as the second single.

Commercial performance
Praise peaked at No. 1 on the Billboard Top Gospel Albums chart and spawned the single "I Got Angels", which reached No. 1 on both the Billboard's Hot Single Sales chart and Gospel Digital Song Sales chart.

Track listing
Credits adapted from Tidal.

Credits

Executive producers
Aulsondro "Novelist" Hamilton
 Frank DeRozan
 Jack “De’Jon” Clark
 Chantal Grayson
 BJ Luster

Gerard Harmon - Senior VP of A&R

Producers
 Sam Peezy
 DJ Fat Jack
 Richard Smallwood
 Steven Ford
 DJ Cube & King Philip (ULP Productions)

Engineering
 Orlando Gomez @ Beacon Hill Recording Studios, (El Paso, Texas)
 Tony Touch @ Touch Tone Studios (Riverside, California)
 Ivan @ Clear Lake Recording Studios (North Hollywood, California)
 Dan Naim @ The Cave (Woodland Hills, California)
 Sam Peezy @ Peezy Institute of Technology (Carrollton, Georgia)

Charts

Weekly charts

Year-end charts

Awards and nominations

References

2017 albums
Emcee N.I.C.E. albums